Deputy Assistant Secretary of the Navy may refer to the following U.S. offices:
 Deputy Assistant Secretary of the Navy (Acquisition and Procurement)
 Deputy Assistant Secretary of the Navy (Air)
 Deputy Assistant Secretary of the Navy (C4I and Space)
 Deputy Assistant Secretary of the Navy (Civilian Human Resources)
 Deputy Assistant Secretary of the Navy (Environment)
 Deputy Assistant Secretary of the Navy (Expeditionary Programs and Logistics Management)
 Deputy Assistant Secretary of the Navy (Infrastructure Strategy and Analysis)
 Deputy Assistant Secretary of the Navy (Installations & Facilities)
 Deputy Assistant Secretary of the Navy (International Programs)
 Deputy Assistant Secretary of the Navy (Management and Budget)
 Deputy Assistant Secretary of the Navy (Military Personnel Policy)
 Deputy Assistant Secretary of the Navy (Research, Development, Test & Evaluation)
 Deputy Assistant Secretary of the Navy (Reserve Affairs)
 Deputy Assistant Secretary of the Navy (Safety)
 Deputy Assistant Secretary of the Navy (Ships)
 Deputy Assistant Secretary of the Navy (Total Force Transformation)